Chris Thomas King (born Durwood Christopher Thomas, October 14, 1962) is an American blues musician and actor based in New Orleans, Louisiana.

History
King was born in Baton Rouge, Louisiana, United States. He is the son of blues musician Tabby Thomas. His early recordings were released under the name Chris Thomas.  He has won awards including "Album of the Year" for both Grammy Award and Country Music Awards. King has sold more than 10 million records in the United States. He is featured playing the part of Tommy Johnson in the Coen brothers' 2000 film O Brother, Where Art Thou?. He is also featured in Down from the Mountain and More Music from Ray soundtracks.

In June 2021, King’s book “The Blues: The Authentic Narrative of My Music And Culture” was published by Chicago Review Press.  The book is compelling, making a powerful, trenchant, well-supported case that the Blues - encompassing other genres such as jazz, RnB, New Orleans music, and other forms - derives from the urban and urbane Creole culture of New Orleans.  He further argues persuasively that the received narrative of blues’ genesis in the Mississippi Delta is both incorrect and that the narrative derives from erasure of New Orleans Creole accomplishments.

Artistic career
King is known as the pioneer of rap/blues fusion. He conceived the first sample-based blues concept album in the early 1990s by writing and producing the first all-rap/blues album for RCA Records titled 21st Century Blues… from da Hood.

As an entrepreneur King took control of his master recordings in the early 1990s, forming 21st Century Blues Records. He also established a publishing company, Young Blues Rebel, LLC. 21st Century Records signed the New Orleans Ninth Ward rap/blues duo the 21C-B-Boyz and the London, England-based NuBlues, to 21st Century Blues Records in 2003.
 
King's acting career includes prominent roles in several films, including two music-related films. In the Oscar-winning film Ray he plays band leader and blues guitar player Lowell Fulson. During production he collaborated with Ray Charles in scoring the film. In O Brother Where Art Thou?, he portrays a skilled blues guitarist who claims he sold his soul to the devil in exchange for his skill on guitar. The character is based on blues musicians Tommy Johnson and Robert Johnson, both of whom have been linked to selling their soul to the devil at a rural Mississippi crossroads. King also accompanies the film's band the Soggy Bottom Boys on guitar; his rendition of Skip James's Hard Time Killing Floor Blues was recorded live during filming and included on the film's Grammy-award-winning soundtrack.

King also starred in the Wim Wenders art house film The Soul of a Man, as Blind Willie Johnson and Kill Switch as Detective Storm with Steven Seagal.

Filmography
O Brother, Where Art Thou? (2000), as Tommy Johnson
The Soul of a Man (2003), as Blind Willie Johnson
Ray (2004), as Lowell Fulson
Kill Switch (2008) as detective Storm Anderson
Imagination Movers (2010)
Treme (2011) HBO series.

Documentary appearances
Last of the Mississippi Jukes (2003)
Lightning in a Bottle (2004)
The Soul of a Man (2003)
22nd Annual W.C. Handy Blues Awards (2001)
Down from the Mountain (2000)
Inside Look: Down from the Mountain (2000)

Discography
Blue Beat (1984) as Chris Thomas
The Beginning (1986) as Chris Thomas
Cry of the Prophets (1990) as Chris Thomas
Help Us, Somebody single (1993) as Chris Thomas (also on Just Say Da compilation)
Where the Pyramid Meets the Eye: A Tribute to Roky Erickson (1990)
Simple (1993) as Chris Thomas
21st Century Blues... from da Hood (1994) as Chris Thomas
Chris Thomas King (1997)
Red Mud (1998)
Whole Lotta Blues: The Songs of Led Zeppelin (1999)
Me, My Guitar and the Blues (2000)
O Brother, Where Art Thou? soundtrack (2000)
Down from the Mountain (2001)
The Legend of Tommy Johnson, Act 1: Genesis 1900s-1990s (2001)
It's a Cold Ass World: The Beginning (2001)
Dirty South Hip-Hop Blues (2002)
A Young Man's Blues (2002)
The Roots (2003)
Along the Blues Highway (2003) with Blind Mississippi Morris
 Johnny's Blues: A Tribute to Johnny Cash (2003)
Why My Guitar Screams & Moans (2004)
Ray soundtrack (2004)
Rise (2006)
Live on Beale Street (2008)
Antebellum Postcards (2011)
Bona Fide (2012)
Hotel Voodoo (2017)
ANGOLA (2020)

References

External links
 Chris Thomas King's website
 
 Information and video Chris Thomas King speaks in an interview on the business pitfalls of music and how to avoid them.
 Listen or watch Woodsongs archived show 404 Chris Thomas King on his tragic experience with hurricane Katrina by performance and in interviews with Michael Johnathon before a live audience on July 17, 2006; video is 87 minutes.
Artist Connection Podcast interview with Chris Thomas King

1962 births
McKinley Senior High School alumni
American male actors
American blues guitarists
American male guitarists
American blues singers
Black Top Records artists
Grammy Award winners
Living people
Musicians from Baton Rouge, Louisiana
Slide guitarists
Singers from Louisiana
Private Music artists
Guitarists from Louisiana
20th-century American guitarists
Scotti Brothers Records artists
African-American guitarists
20th-century African-American male singers
21st-century African-American male singers